James Archer may refer to:

James C. Archer (1900–1980), Administrator of the Northern Territory
James J. Archer (1817–1864), American Civil War general
James J. Archer (Maryland politician) (1860–1921), American politician and lawyer
James T. Archer (1819–1859), Florida Attorney General and Secretary of State of Florida
James W. Archer (1828–1908), American soldier and Medal of Honor recipient
James Archer (artist) (1823–1904), Scottish portrait painter
James Archer (Jesuit) (1550–1620), Irish member of the Society of Jesus
James Archer (preacher) (1751–1834), English Catholic preacher
James Archer (rugby union), (1900–1979), New Zealand rugby union player
James Archer (stock trader) (born 1974), son of Jeffrey Archer, politician
James Archer (born 1850), shipwreck survivor charged with murder in a precursor to the case of R v Dudley and Stephens
Jimmy Archer (1883–1958), Major League Baseball catcher
Jamie Archer, British singer